Vitali Nikolayevich Panov (born 21 August 1979) is a Russian professional football coach and a former player.

Career
Born in Zheleznogorsk, Kursk Oblast, Panov began playing football in FC Oryol's youth system. He became a professional footballer with FC Mozdok under manager Yuri Gazzaev.

Panov was appointed caretaker manager of FC KAMAZ Naberezhnye Chelny during October 2009, replacing his former manager, Yuri Gazzaev.

References

External links
 

1979 births
People from Zheleznogorsk, Kursk Oblast
Living people
Russian footballers
FC KAMAZ Naberezhnye Chelny players
Russian football managers
FC KAMAZ Naberezhnye Chelny managers
FC Oryol players
Association football midfielders
FC Nosta Novotroitsk players
Sportspeople from Kursk Oblast